Erich Mächler (also spelled Maechler) (born 24 September 1960 in Hochdorf) is a former professional Swiss cyclist. In the 1987 Tour de France, he wore the yellow jersey for 6 days. He was the Swiss National Road Race champion in 1984.

Major results

1982
Tour du Nord-Ouest
Stage 8 in the Tour de Suisse
1983
Grand prix de Mendrisio
Stage 6 in the Tour de Suisse
1984
Stage 2 in the Tirreno–Adriatico, 2nd place overall
Championnat des Trois Nations
1986
Winner of stage 21 in the Tour de France
Stage 5 of Critérium du Dauphiné Libéré
1987
Yellow jersey for 6 days in the Tour de France
Milan–San Remo
Prologue and 4th stage of Critérium du Dauphiné Libéré
1988
1st overall in the Tirreno–Adriatico
Stages 2 and 6B
Volta al Camp Morverde
Tour de Valence
1989
Stage 4 of the Tirreno–Adriatico
Kika Classic à Sankt-Polten
1992
Tour du Nord-Ouest

References

1960 births
Living people
People from Hochdorf District
Swiss male cyclists
Swiss Tour de France stage winners
Tour de Suisse stage winners
Sportspeople from the canton of Lucerne